Robert Bradbury may refer to:

 Robert North Bradbury (1886–1949), American film director and screenwriter
 Robert J. Bradbury (1956–2011), author of the Matrioshka brain concept